Penn Square Bank was a small commercial bank located in Oklahoma City, Oklahoma. The bank made a large number of poorly underwritten energy-related loans that it sold to other banks. Losses on these loans led to significant financial problems in these banks. Penn Square Bank declared bankruptcy in July 1982.

History 
The bank was founded in 1960 and was located in the rear of the Penn Square Mall in Oklahoma City. The bank made its name in high-risk energy loans during the late 1970s and early 1980s Oklahoma and Texas oil boom. Between 1974 and 1982, the bank's assets increased more than 15 times to $525 million and its deposits swelled from $29 million to more than $450 million. As a result primarily of irresponsible lending practices in connection with the sale of over $1 billion in "loan participations" to other banks throughout America, Penn Square Bank failed in July 1982. Unlike most previous bank failures since the Federal Deposit Insurance Corporation (FDIC) was formed, the uninsured depositors suffered losses as no other bank was willing to assume the deposits.  As most of the deposits came from other financial institutions and represented high interest-rate jumbo certificates of deposit that were largely uninsured, this represented a major loss for the depositors.  The investigation by the FDIC after the bank failure uncovered 451 possible criminal violations.

The bank is often cited as being partly responsible for the collapse of Continental Illinois National Bank and Trust Company of Chicago, which had to write off $326 million in loans purchased from Penn Square. In addition, there were major losses at other banks, including Seattle First National Bank, Michigan National Bank, and Chase Manhattan Bank in New York (Seattle First and Continental Illinois were eventually acquired by Bank of America predecessor BankAmerica; the former in 1983 and the latter in 1994). The bank's collapse coincided with the 1980s oil glut and Penn Square was the first of 139 Oklahoma banks that failed in the 1980s. The insolvency was the subject of two best-selling books and led to a two-year prison term for the bank's energy-lending chief, Bill Patterson.

Penn Square alumni 
 Bill P. (Beep) Jennings (b. 1923, d. 2003)
 William G. "Bill" Patterson
 Laurence Francis Rooney Jr. (b. 1925, d. 1980)
 Richard C. Haugland
 William Eugene Rowsey III

References

Further reading

 Hightower, Michael J., “Penn Square: The Shopping Center Bank That Shook the World, Part 1 — Boom,” Chronicles of Oklahoma, 90 (2012), 68–99.
 Hightower, Michael J., “Penn Square: The Shopping Center Bank That Shook the World, Part 2 – Bust,” Chronicles of Oklahoma, 90 (2012), 204–36.
 Zweig, Phillip L., Belly Up: The Collapse of the Penn Square Bank. (1985) Crown Publishers 
 Singer, Mark, Funny Money. (1985) Knopf

External links
 FDIC history of the Penn Square Bank failure
 New York Times Article - 'MICKEY MOUSE IN OKLAHOMA'
 PENN SQUARE BANK FAILURE; HEARINGS BEFORE THE COMMITTEE ON BANKING, FINANCE AND URBAN AFFAIRS; HOUSE OF REPRESENTATIVES; NINETY-SEVENTH CONGRESS; SECOND SESSION; PART 1; JULY 15; AND AUGUST 16, 1982
 PENN SQUARE BANK FAILURE; HEARINGS BEFORE THE COMMITTEE ON BANKING, FINANCE AND URBAN AFFAIRS; HOUSE OF REPRESENTATIVES; NINETY-SEVENTH CONGRESS; SECOND SESSION; PART 2; SEPTEMBER 29 AND 30, 1982 
 FAILURE OF PENN SQUARE BANK; HEARING BEFORE THE COMMITTEE ON BANKING, HOUSING, AND URBAN AFFAIRS; UNITED STATES SENATE NINETY-SEVENTH  CONGRESS; SECOND SESSION;  DECEMBER 10, 1982
 "Breaking the Bank" OETA Television; May 5, 2016
Belly Up: The Collapse of the Penn Square Bank
Funny Money

Banks based in Oklahoma
Companies based in Oklahoma City
Defunct banks of the United States
Banks established in 1960
Banks disestablished in 1982
Defunct companies based in Oklahoma
1960 establishments in Oklahoma
1982 disestablishments in Oklahoma
Bank failures in the United States